Roby Duke (December 6, 1956 – December 26, 2007) was a contemporary Christian musician and songwriter from Greenwood, Mississippi. He was noted for his blues-inflected vocal style and rhythmic "thumping" acoustic guitar playing.

Discography
1980 Not the Same
1984 Come Let Us Reason
1986 Blue Eyed Soul
1989 Down to Business
1994 Bridge Divine
2004 Ghost
2006 Relaxed Fits

References

External links
 , Spectrasonics Profile via Archive.org. Retrieved August 13, 2015.
 Profile, christianmusiciansummit.com. Retrieved August 13, 2015.

American performers of Christian music
1956 births
2007 deaths
Performers of contemporary Christian music
People from Greenwood, Mississippi
Musicians from Mississippi
Place of birth missing
20th-century American musicians